Nozh or Nizh ("Knife" in Russian and Ukrainian, respectively) is a brand of explosive reactive armour designed by the Kharkiv Morozov Machine Building Design Bureau and manufactured in Ukraine by the state enterprise Fundamental Center of Crucial Technologies (FCCT-Microtek). Nozh modules have been provided by the government of Ukraine for the upgrade of Pakistani Al-Khalid tank.

Nozh modules are fitted to the exterior of a tank or other armored vehicle. As with all ERA modules, they are designed to explode when impacted by a weapon. Nozh modules differ from other ERA modules in that they are specifically designed to eliminate or minimize damage to adjacent modules, thus allowing for a 200% to 300% increased effectiveness against multiple weapon impacts, compared to other ERA module designs.

References

External links 
 

Armoured fighting vehicle equipment
Vehicle armour
Weapons countermeasures
Military technology
Ukrainian inventions